I Gotta Make It is the debut studio album by American R&B recording artist Trey Songz. It was released on July 26, 2005, by Atlantic Records.

Background
Recording sessions took place from 2004 to 2005, with Trey Songz' then mentor Troy Taylor, alongside Mike Caren and Delante Murphy serving as the records executive producers, while the additional production by Warryn Campbell and Bei Maejor; additionally, there are four guest appearances from American rappers Twista, Juvenile and T.I., alongside American R&B singer Aretha Franklin.

The album was supported by two singles: "Gotta Make It" featuring Twista, and "Gotta Go". The album debuted at number 20 on the US Billboard 200.

Singles 
The title track, called "Gotta Make It" was released as the first single from the album on November 23, 2004. The song features guest verse from American rapper Twista, while the production was provided by Trey Songz' then mentor Troy Taylor.

The album's second and final single, called "Gotta Go" was released on July 9, 2005. The song was produced by Troy Taylor.

Critical reception 

Andy Kellman of AllMusic said that the album "is both very enjoyable and full of promise, carrying a fine balance between throwback and modern hip-hop soul".

Track listing 
Information is taken from Liner Notes and Discogs.com except where noted. Tracks 1–6 & 8–17: Vocals produced by Trey Songz Tracks 5–7, 10 & 12: Vocals produced by Troy Taylor. Tracks 2–6, 8–10 & 12–17 feature Background Vocals performed by Trey Songz & Troy Taylor

Sample credits
 "Gotta Make It" contains elements from "It's Forever" performed by The Ebonys. 
 "Cheat on You" contains elements from "(Let Me Put) Love on Your Mind" performed by Con Funk Shun. 
 "Gotta Go" and "Gotta Go (Reprise)" contains elements from "Child" performed by 21st Century.

Charts

Weekly charts

Year-end charts

References

Trey Songz albums
2005 debut albums
Albums produced by Maejor
Albums produced by Scott Storch
Albums produced by J. R. Rotem
Albums produced by Troy Taylor (record producer)
Albums produced by Warryn Campbell
Atlantic Records albums